Linda Lee (born July 3, 1979) is an American politician from New York City who is the city councilmember of New York City's 23rd City Council district, representing the Democratic Party.

Lee grew up in Oakland Gardens, Queens. She received her B.A. from Barnard College and her Master's of Social Work from Columbia University. Before running in the council elections aged 42, she had never previously sought office. She campaigned for election on a platform of increasing services for senior citizens, improved accountability of police by citizens, and workforce training to help recover the economy in the aftermath of the COVID-19 pandemic.

After winning the November 2021 general election, she became the first Asian American woman to represent the district, along with a wave of previously unrepresented minorities on the City Council. She succeeded fellow Democrat Barry Grodenchik; her term is intended to run for two years instead of the usual four because of planned redistricting.

References

New York City Council members
Living people
Women New York City Council members
Asian-American New York City Council members
Barnard College alumni
Columbia University School of Social Work alumni
1979 births